The Battert is a hill, on the western edge of the Northern Black Forest north of Baden-Baden in Germany. On its western slopes are the ruins of Hohenbaden Castle (the Altes Schloss or "Old Castle"), on the southern side is the climbing area and nature reserve called the Battert Rocks (Battertfelsen). On the hill ridge are the remains of a circular rampart, probably built by Celtic settlers. On the eastern side lies the village of Ebersteinburg.

The Battert is a destination for ramblers and climbers all year round, heading for the 15–60-metre-high Battertfelsen. Above and below the rock face is a footpath around the rocks. The red rock face is visible from far off and may be easily reached on the road to the ruins of Hohenbaden or from a car park near Ebersteinburg.

Geology 
Consisting of sediments of Rotliegend, the Battertfelsen were formed about 251-299 million years ago. By contrast with their immediate environment, the rocks of the Battertfelsen silicified due to an east-west oriented fault line. Because of this silicification the rock became more erosion-resistant which is why they now stand out so prominently.

Nature reserve 
An area of 34.9 hectares around the Battertfelsen and east of Hohenbaden Castle on the south side of the hill was declared as a nature reserve by the Regierungspräsidium Karlsruhe on 30 June 1981. The reserve is known as Battertfelsen near Hohenbaden Castle (Battertfelsen beim Schloss Hohenbaden). The geologically and earth-historically important rock group is home to rare insects, reptiles, ravens and peregrine falcons and also to rare plant species, especially in the stone run woodland below the rock faces.

Climbing 
Thanks to Wilhelm Paulcke the popularity of the Battert as a climbing area grew after he had opened the first climbing routes there in about 1885. Since then a large number of routes with different levels of difficulty have been developed, from grade II to grade IX.
On 24 October 1964 Toni Kinshofer, who was the first to climb the Diamir flank of Nanga Parbat and climbed the Eiger north face the year before, fell from the heights of the Battert and died of his injuries shortly after.

Climbing routes 
 Kuhkamin (III), about 1885
 Marterkamin (IV+ to V-), about 1885
 Paulckeweg (III), Wilhelm Paulcke about 1890
 Bockgrat (IV+), first ascent in 1905
 Alter Pforzheimer Weg (IV+), 1925 by Walter Stößer
 Neuer Pforzheimer Weg (VI), by Walter Stößer
 Wespenkante (V), by Walter Stößer
 Neue Falkenwand (VII-), 1945 by Martin Schliessler
 Kühnkante (VI+), Reinhard Karl and Kurt Jägel
 Südostverschneidung (VII-), Martin Schliessler and Kurt Jägel

Gallery

References

Literature 
 Kletterführer Schwarzwald Nord. 2. Auflage, Panico Alpinverlag, Köngen, 2013, .
 Urban Schurhammer: Der Battert – Ein Kletterführer durch die Felsen bei Baden-Baden. Verlag Sektion Karlsruhe des Deutschen und Österreichischen Alpenvereins, Karlsruhe, um 1928 (out of print)

External links 

 The Battert in the rock information system of the German Alpine Club
  Information about the Battertfelsen
 

Mountains and hills of Baden-Württemberg
Baden-Baden
Mountains and hills of the Black Forest